Matt Hill (born November 10, 1978) is a former American football offensive tackle who played two seasons with the Seattle Seahawks of the National Football League. He was drafted by the Seattle Seahawks in the fifth round of the 2002 NFL Draft. Hill played college football at Boise State University and attended Grangeville High School in Grangeville, Idaho. He was also a member of the Rhein Fire and Carolina Panthers.

Professional career

Seattle Seahawks
Hill was drafted by the Seattle Seahawks with the 271st pick in the 2002 NFL Draft. He was released by the Seahawks on September 5, 2004.

Carolina Panthers
Hill signed with the Carolina Panthers on January 12, 2005. He was allocated to NFL Europe on and assigned to the Rhein Fire on January 22, 2005 February 15, 2005. He was released by the Panthers on March 2, 2006.

References

External links
Just Sports Stats
NFL Draft Scout

Living people
1978 births
Players of American football from Idaho
American football offensive tackles
Boise State Broncos football players
Seattle Seahawks players
Rhein Fire players
People from Grangeville, Idaho